Wied's marmoset (Callithrix kuhlii), also known as Wied's black-tufted-ear marmoset, is a New World monkey that lives in tropical and subtropical forests of eastern Brazil. Unlike other marmosets, Wied's marmoset lives in groups consisting of 4 or 5 females and 2 or 3 males (plus children). They are matriarchal, and only the dominant female is allowed to mate. Like other marmosets, the offspring are always born in pairs.

Diet

This monkey supplements its diet of sap with fruit, nectar, flowers and seeds, as well as spiders and insects. Since these are harvested from the middle and lower part of the forest, Wied's marmoset often travels and forages in the company of the golden-headed lion tamarin, which forages in the canopy.

Natural Predators

Wied's marmoset is eaten by birds of prey (the harpy eagle, the gray hawk, the roadside hawk and the white-tailed hawk), felines (the jaguar, jaguarundi and ocelot) and snakes.

Behavior

Wied's marmoset is highly social, spending much of its time grooming. It has individually distinctive calls, and it communicates through gestures and olfactory markings as well.

Appearance

The coloring of Wied's marmoset is mostly black, with white markings on cheeks and forehead. It has rings on its tail and black tufts of fur coming out of its ears.

Chimerism

Chimeric individuals carry two or more genetic cell lines in their bodies, each of which stems from a separate and genetically distinct zygote. This chimerism is the result of cell lines exchanged between siblings in utero. These two original zygotes were fertilized by two different sperm, which potentially came from more than one male. Therefore, chimeric individuals exhibit a phenotype that is the result of more than one genotype, and potentially more than one father.

Researchers first discovered chimerism in the bone marrow of marmosets in the 1960s. More recent work has shown that chimerism can occur in all cell lines, including germ cells. This allows for the possibility of horizontal inheritance. In other words, individuals could pass on the genotype that is different from their majority (or self) genotype. Consider a father marmoset was chimeric in his germ line. This father could potentially pass on his secondary cell line (the majority or self cell line of his brother) to his offspring. In this way, this father's offspring would be more genetically similar to their uncle than to their father.

Since chimerism changes the degrees of relatedness between individuals, it also changes the adaptive value of certain behaviors, like cooperatively raising young. It has been proposed that chimerism creates a system that makes it evolutionarily advantageous for an individual to cooperate to raise its siblings; this closely matches to the way marmoset social systems have been observed to function in the wild.

References

External links
 Animal Diversity Web: Callithrix kuhlii

Wied's marmoset
Mammals of Brazil
Endemic fauna of Brazil
Wied's marmoset
Wied's marmoset